Maras-e Kuchak (also Romanized as Maras-e Kūchak and Maras-e Kuchek; also known as Marest-e Kūchak) is a village in Estakhr-e Posht Rural District, Hezarjarib District, Neka County, Mazandaran Province, Iran. At the 2006 census, its population was 82, in 24 families.

References 

Populated places in Neka County